Helianthus pumilus is a North American species of sunflower known by the common name little sunflower or bush sunflower. It is found in the western United States, primarily the Rocky Mountain region of Montana, Wyoming, and Colorado, with a few isolated populations in Utah and Idaho.

Helianthus pumilus grows on dry rocky soil in the mountains and nearby plains. It is a perennial herb up to 100 cm (40 inches) tall. One plant usually produces 1-6 flower heads, each containing 8-13 yellow ray florets surrounding 30 or more yellow or brown disc florets.

References

External links
Eastern Colorado Wildflowers photos
Lady Bird Johnson Wildlower Center, University of Texas

pumilus
Flora of the Western United States
Plants described in 1841
Flora without expected TNC conservation status